A Fairy Tale (AKA A Magic Tale) - Fantastic ballet in 1 Act, with choreography by Marius Petipa, and music by (?) Richter.

First presented by students of the Imperial Ballet School on April 4/16 (Julian/Gregorian calendar dates), 1891 in the theatre of the Imperial Ballet School, St. Petersburg, Russia.

Notes

Anna Pavlova participated in this ballet when she was ten years old during her first year as a student at the Imperial Ballet School. It was the first ballet she ever danced in at the Mariinsky Theatre. Her last performance at the Mariinsky would be as Nikiya in La Bayadère in 1914.

Ballets by Marius Petipa
Ballets premiered in Saint Petersburg
1891 ballet premieres